Chhitubhai Gamit (22 April 1942 – 17 December 2013) was an Indian politician belonging to the Indian National Congress. He was elected in 1977,1980,1984,1989,1991,1996 and 1998 from Mandvi in Gujarat to the lower House of the Indian Parliament the Lok Sabha

References

External links
Official biographical sketch in Parliament of India website

1942 births
2013 deaths
Lok Sabha members from Gujarat
India MPs 1977–1979
India MPs 1980–1984
India MPs 1984–1989
India MPs 1989–1991
India MPs 1991–1996
India MPs 1996–1997
India MPs 1998–1999
Indian National Congress politicians from Gujarat